The  was fought in late November 1614 between the forces of Tokugawa Ieyasu and the Toyotomi clan. This battle was one of the first of the series of battles fought near Osaka over the course of two years. The village of Imafuku stood on the northeast approach to Osaka, and so Tokugawa Ieyasu sent 1500 men under the command of Satake Yoshinobu to secure the site for a fort. They faced off against 600 men loyal to the Toyotomi "Western Army," under two generals named Iida and Yado.

After Satake routed the defenders from the village and killed Iida, reinforcements from the Western Army arrived. Kimura Shigenari and Gotō Mototsugu led a charge, incurring major casualties on the Eastern force and forcing Satake to call a withdrawal.

However, in the end, the Western forces were forced back once more after Uesugi Kagekatsu arrived with reinforcements for Satake's men. Satake then managed to finally get a hold on the village.

References 

Turnbull, Stephen (1998). The Samurai Sourcebook. London: Cassell & Co.

Imafuku
1614 in Japan
Imafuku
Imafuku